Milyuga Land District is a land district (cadastral division) of Western Australia, located within the Eastern Land Division in the Gibson Desert. It spans roughly 24°00'S - 26°50'S in latitude and 125°50'E - 129°00'E in longitude, and includes the town of Warburton and the Giles Weather Station.

History
The district was created on 3 February 1932, and was defined in the Government Gazette:

References

Land districts of Western Australia